Elie Carafoli (September 15, 1901, Veria, Salonica Vilayet, Ottoman Empire–October 24, 1983, Bucharest, Romania) was an accomplished Romanian engineer and aircraft designer. He is considered a pioneering contributor to the field of Aerodynamics.

Biography

First years, education 
Carafoli was of Aromanian descent. In 1915, he left Greece for Bitola, and then Bucharest, where he studied at Gheorghe Lazăr High School. In 1919 he entered University Politehnica of Bucharest, graduating with a degree in electrical engineering. He pursued his studies at the University of Paris, while also working at the Institut Aérotechnique in Saint-Cyr-l'École, France. He obtained a Ph.D. in 1928, with a thesis entitled Contribution to the theory of aerodynamic lift.

Activity in Romania 
In 1928, Carafoli returned to Bucharest, where he joined the faculty at the Polytechnic University, and founded the Aerodynamics chair; later in 1936 he was promoted to full professor. It was here that he built the first wind tunnel in South-Eastern Europe, and elaborated some of the theory on which calculations of wing profiles of supersonic aircraft are based.

From 1930 to 1937 Carafoli worked at Industria Aeronautică Română in Braşov.  Together with Lucién Virmoux from Blériot Aéronautique, he designed the IAR CV-11, a single-seat, low-wing monoplane fighter aircraft. A prototype was flown in 1931 by Captain Romeo Popescu, in an attempt at breaking the flight airspeed record, but the plane crashed, and the pilot lost his life. Carafoli also designed  the IAR 14 and IAR 15 aircraft, and later in 1937 initiated the development of the legendary IAR 80 fighter aircraft, at the urging of Prime Minister Armand Călinescu.

Recognition 
In 1948, he was elected to the Romanian Academy. In 1949 he became director of the Institute  of Applied Mechanics of the Academy.

Carafoli was President of the International Astronautical Federation from 1968 to 1970.  In 1971, he  reorganized, along with Henri Coandă, the Department of Aeronautical Engineering of the Polytechnic University of Bucharest, spinning it off from the Department of Mechanical Engineering.

Carafoli was awarded the Louis Breguet Prize (Paris, 1927), the Gauss Medal, and the Apollo 11 Medal (1971).

Selected publications

References

External links 
   "Academician Elie Carafol" – short bio, at incas.ro
  "Elie Carafoli" – short bio, at aviatori.ro

1901 births
1983 deaths
Aerodynamicists
Aircraft designers
Aviation history of Romania
Deaths in Romania
Gheorghe Lazăr National College (Bucharest) alumni
Greek people of Aromanian descent
Romanian people of Aromanian descent
Members of the Romanian Academy of Sciences
People from Veria
People from Salonica vilayet
Politehnica University of Bucharest alumni
Academic staff of the Politehnica University of Bucharest
Romanian aerospace engineers
20th-century Romanian inventors
Titular members of the Romanian Academy
University of Paris alumni
Romanian expatriates in France
Greek emigrants to Romania